Schwarzenberg is a municipality in the Bregenz Forest in the western Austrian state of Vorarlberg, part of the district of Bregenz. Schwarzenberg has an area of 25.76 km². It lies south of Lake Constance. The village center is heritage-protected for its traditional rustic wooden houses.

Population
According to the last count in September 2011, the municipality has 1810 inhabitants.

Economy 
The main sources of income in Schwarzenberg are crafts, tourism and agriculture. In addition to a dozen larger companies, there are also around 100 small and micro companies.

Every year, about 50,000 guests spend the night in Schwarzenberg, around 55% of them during the summer months. The municipality of Schwarzenberg offers many opportunities for recreation in nature, offering the Schwarzenberg-Bödele ski area, cross-country trails, and around 40 km of winter and summer hiking trails. Women’s World Cup downhill competitions were also held in Schwarzenberg.

Livestock farming is of great importance. A farmers’ livestock association was founded back in 1894, and today there are around 45 farms, with a total of 700 cows; sheep and goats are also kept. The Alpine Transhumance (mountain meadow culture) is still very well preserved there: About 650 cows are "alped" annually, which means they are sent to the higher mountain pastures in the spring/summer and brought back down into the lower regions in the autumn/winter months.

Personalities
The famous artist Angelica Kauffman (1741-1807) grew up in Schwarzenberg.

Culture

Points of interest 
The Angelika Kauffmann Museum displays oil paintings, porcelain, souvenirs and letters from Angelika Kauffmann's father in Schwarzenberg. This local museum also offers a broad overview of Bregenzerwälder living culture in the 18th century.

The Schwarzenberg parish church is considered to be one of the most beautiful Baroque buildings in Vorarlberg. The church has paintings by Angelika Kauffmann and her father.

Schwarzenberg is part of the Bregenzerwald Umgang (literally "Bregenzerwald Walking Tour"). This walking tour offers insights into the architecture and community planning of 12 traditional villages in the Bregenzerwald. While walking over various landscapes, visiting public buildings, homes and everyday objects, walkers gain a comprehensive overview of typical Bregenzerwald architectural styles as they developed throughout the ages. The Angelika Kauffmann Hall in Schwarzenberg is of particular importance. The hall was rebuilt in 2001 and has been used for musical events ever since. Because of its excellent acoustics, the auditorium was even named one of the three best chamber music venues in the world.

The Käsestraße Bregenzerwald is a joint venture between farmers, milk farmers, artisans, gastronomers, and various companies in the Bregenz Forest. The members and partners contribute to the maintenance of small-scale agriculture and mountain pasture culture, the diversity of local products, and the cheese culture in Vorarlberg. Farmers in Schwarzenberg also take part in this initiative and sell cheese in farm shops, many offering tourists tours of their cheese production facilities.

Events 
The Schubertiade Vorarlberg takes place every year in the summer. It is a world-famous lied- and chamber-music festival, which focuses on compositions that are usually not played at larger concerts, and which mostly have been composed by Austrian composer Franz Schubert. Performances in the past have included artists like Alfred Brendel, Emerson String Quartet, Michael Schade, Robert Holl, Angelika Kirchschlager, and Thomas Quasthoff.

The Schwarzenberger Markt takes place in mid-September each year. The market has grown over time, evolving from a simple village food market into a traditional social highlight in the Bregenz Forest.

The Schwarzenberger Alptag takes place annually in the week before the Schwarzenberg Markt. Around 700 festively decorated cows and sheep are returned to the valley after the summer on the mountain pastures (see Alpine Transhumance). This so-called "Almabtrieb" is a 400-year-old tradition in Schwarzenberg.

References

External links

Schubertiade Festival Schwarzenberg
Community of Schwarzenberg
Architecture Trail
Schwarzenberg Tourism

Cities and towns in Bregenz District